Rupe is a surname of Germanic origin. The closest associated German surname to Rupe is Ruprecht, which in German, is used to describe the helper of St. Nicholas (Knecht Ruprecht) or Santa's helper, but literally means helper (knecht) to right (recht) children who are rude/gruff (rup or ruppig) or naughty.

Individuals with the surname Rupe include:

 Art Rupe (1917–2022), American music industry executive and record producer, founder of the record label Specialty Records, born Arthur Goldberg
 Carmen Rupe (1936-2011), New Zealand-Australian drag performer, brothel keeper and anti-discrimination and HIV/AIDS activist
 Doug Rupe, Australian Paralympic athlete who competed in the 1976 Paralympic Games
 Eric Rupe (born 1963), American BMX racer
 Hans Rupe (1866-1951), Swiss professor of organic chemistry
 Josh Rupe (born 1982), American former Major League Baseball relief pitcher
 Ryan Rupe (born 1975), American former Major League Baseball pitcher

See also
 Alanus de Rupe (c. 1428-1475), Roman Catholic theologian